The Duleep Trophy in 2005–06 was a cricket competition played in India between the five zones of India. All matches in the competition were first-class and the 2005–06 competition was hosted by the West Zone. As in some past years, the five zones were joined by an "A" team from one of the Test match-playing nations, Zimbabwe. The 2005–06 Trophy was won by the West Zone.

Preliminary Matches

South Zone v West Zone (20–23 October)
West Zone (4pts) beat South Zone (0pts) by 7 wickets

East Zone v North Zone (20–23 October)
East Zone (4pts) beat North Zone (0pts) by 9 wickets

Central Zone v South Zone (27–30 October)
Central Zone (4pts) beat South Zone (0pts) by 8 wickets

North Zone v Zimbabwe A (27–30 October)
North Zone (5pts) beat Zimbabwe A (0pts) by an innings and 7 runs

Central Zone v West Zone (4–7 November)
West Zone (4pts) beat Central Zone (0pts) by 7 wickets

East Zone v Zimbabwe A (4–7 November)
East Zone (5pts) beat Zimbabwe A (0pts) by an innings and 17 runs

Table after preliminary matches

Final

West Zone v East Zone (12–16 November)
West Zone beat East Zone by 5 wickets

2005–06 Indian cricket season